James Alexander Beevers (born 31 January 1979) is a British fencer. He competed in the individual foil event at the 2000 Summer Olympics. He was a four times British fencing champion, winning four foil titles at the British Fencing Championships, from 1999 to 2004.

References

External links
 
 
 
 

1979 births
Living people
British male fencers
Olympic fencers of Great Britain
Fencers at the 2000 Summer Olympics
Sportspeople from Southend-on-Sea